Dancing Machine is the ninth studio album released by the Motown quintet the Jackson 5, on September 5, 1974. The album's title track was a No. 2 pop hit and a No. 1 R&B hit in the United States. The group released two additional singles from the album: the funky "Whatever You Got, I Want" and the group's last US Top 20 hit for Motown, "I Am Love".

Album information
Although the Jacksons were back on the charts, the brothers, most notably Michael, still complained about their artistic direction. Nonetheless, the album became another disco concept album for the group, and showcased lead singers Michael and Jermaine Jackson. This album was the first on which all the brothers sang in their natural voices on the same song, entitled "It All Begins and Ends with Love". The order is Tito, Jackie, Michael, Marlon and Jermaine, who closes the song. Around this time, the Jacksons were performing in Las Vegas with the rest of the family, leaving this album with low promotion. According to an interview with Don Cornelius on the R&B TV show Soul Train, Michael said that "If I Don't Love You This Way" and "What You Don't Know" were his favorite songs.

The album was arranged by Arthur G. Wright, Jerry Marcellino, Mel Larson, John Bahler, James Anthony Carmichael and Sam Brown III.

Songs
Record World said of the single "Whatever You Got, I Want" that "J5 put their rhythm into more blues-infused motion" and "they boogie down Soul Alley in style."

Track listing
Side one
 "I Am Love"  (Don Fenceton, Jerry Marcellino, Mel Larson, Ronnie Rancifer) – 7:29
 "Whatever You Got, I Want" (Gene Marcellino, Jerry Marcellino, Mel Larson) – 2:58
 "She's a Rhythm Child" (Clarence Drayton, Hal Davis, Ruth Talmage) – 2:39
 "Dancing Machine" (Donald Fletcher, Hal Davis, Weldon Dean Parks) – 2:43

Side two
 "The Life of the Party" (Clarence Drayton, Hal Davis, Tamy Smith) – 2:35
 "What You Don't Know" (Gene Marcellino, Jerry Marcellino, Mel Larson) – 4:25
 "If I Don't Love You This Way" (Leon Ware, Pam Sawyer) – 3:28
 "It All Begins and Ends with Love" (Don Fenceton, Jerry Marcellino, Mel Larson) – 3:07
 "The Mirrors of My Mind" (Charlotte O'Hara, Donald Fletcher, Nita Garfield) – 3:08

A longer version of the title track had previously been included on the group's 1973 album G.I.T.: Get It Together.

Re-release
In 2001, Motown Records remastered all Jackson 5 albums in a "Two Classic Albums/One CD" series (much like they did in the late 1980s). This album was paired with Moving Violation. The bonus tracks were the outtakes "Through Thick and Thin" and the Disc-o-Tech #3 Remix of "Forever Came Today".

Charts

Notes

External links
  Dancing Machine overview at www.jackson5abc.com 

1974 albums
The Jackson 5 albums
Motown albums
Albums produced by Hal Davis